During the 2006–07 English football season, Wycombe Wanderers competed in Football League Two.

Season summary
Wycombe finished solidly in midtable, but their greatest success during the season came in the League Cup. Shock wins against the likes of Fulham and Charlton saw Wycombe reach the semi-finals, where they were drawn against Chelsea. A home draw at Adams Park gave Wycombe fans optimism, but Wycombe were easily beaten 4–0 at Stamford Bridge in the return leg.

Final league table

Results
Wycombe Wanderers's score comes first

Legend

Football League Two

FA Cup

League Cup

Squad
Squad at end of season

Left club during season

References

Notes

Wycombe Wanderers F.C. seasons
Wycombe Wanderers F.C.